The 2008–09 Polish Cup  was the fifty-fifth season of the annual Polish cup competition. It began on July 30, 2008 with the extra preliminary round and ended on May 19, 2009 with the Final, played at Stadion Śląski, Chorzów. The winners qualified for the third qualifying round of the UEFA Europa League. Legia Warszawa were the defending champions.

Extra preliminary round
Eight of the 32 teams which had qualified on regional levels competed in this round.

! colspan="3" style="background:cornsilk;"|30 July 2008

|}

Preliminary round
The four winners of the extra preliminary round and the 24 remaining teams qualified through regional levels competed in this round.
 

! colspan="3" style="background:cornsilk;"|13 August 2008

|}

Round 1
The fourteen winners of the preliminary round, along with the eighteen teams from 2007–08 II Liga, competed in this round.

! colspan="3" style="background:cornsilk;"|26 August 2008

|-
! colspan="3" style="background:cornsilk;"|27 August 2008

|-
! colspan="3" style="background:cornsilk;"|No match

|}

Notes
Note 1: The draw was conducted prior to the merger of Polonia Warsaw and Dyskobolia Grodzisk Wielkopolski. Upon completion of the merger, Stal Stalowa Wola, who were originally to play former II Liga side Polonia Warsaw, were awarded a walkover to the next round.

Round 2
The sixteen winners of Round 1, along with the sixteen teams from 2007–08 Ekstraklasa, competed in this round.

! colspan="3" style="background:cornsilk;"|23 September 2008

|-
! colspan="3" style="background:cornsilk;"|24 September 2008

|-
! colspan="3" style="background:cornsilk;"|7 October 2008

|}

Round 3
The sixteen winners of Round 2 competed in this round.

! colspan="3" style="background:cornsilk;"|28 October 2008

|-
! colspan="3" style="background:cornsilk;"|29 October 2008

|}

Quarter-finals
The quarterfinals were played in two legs. The first legs were played on March 4, 17 and 18, 2009 while the second legs took place on April 7 and 8, 2009.

|}

First leg

Second leg

Semi-finals
The semifinals were also played in two legs. The first legs were played on April 29 and 30, 2009, while the second legs took place on May 6 and 7, 2009.

|}

First leg

Second leg

Final

References

External links
 90minut.pl 

Polish Cup, 2008-09
Polish Cup seasons
Cup